Karl Marx: His Life and Thought is a 1973 biography of Karl Marx by the political scientist David McLellan. The work was republished as Karl Marx: A Biography in 1995.

Summary

McLellan deals with Marx's intellectual, political and private life.

Reception
The political theorist Terrell Carver described the book as, "The most comprehensive scholarly account of Marx's life and works". The historian of science Roger Smith called it "readable and reliable".

References

Bibliography

 
 
 

1973 non-fiction books
Biographies of Karl Marx
Books by David McLellan
British biographies
English-language books